The Lent Bumps 2015 was a series of rowing races at Cambridge University from Wednesday 25 February 2015 to Saturday 28 February 2015. The event was run as a bumps race and was the 128th set of races in the series of Lent Bumps which have been held annually in late February or early March since 1887. See Lent Bumps for the format of the races.

The 2015 Lent Bumps saw CUCBC deciding to cut one division's worth of places (two thirds of the M4 division and one third of the W3 division) compared to recent years. This caused some controversy amongst the college boat clubs. Ultimately the division was not reinstated and as a result the bumps ran over only 4 days (from Wednesday to Saturday), not 5 days (from Tuesday) as in previous years.

Head of the River crews

  men bumped  on day 2, then rowed over head for the next three days to reclaim the Lents headship which they had most recently held from 2011 to 2013.

Highest 2nd VIIIs

  remained the highest placed men's second VIII.

Links to races in other years

References
 Bumps results: Lent Bumps 2015 Men's Division - Cambridge University Combined Boat Clubs (CUCBC)
 Bump Results: Lent Bumps 2015 Women's Division - Cambridge University Combined Boat Clubs (CUCBC)

Lent Bumps
Lent Bumps results
Lent Bumps
Lent Bumps